Arthur Clarence Richardson (4 April 1928 – 15 March 2001) was an Australian rules footballer who played for the South Melbourne Football Club in the Victorian Football League (VFL).

Notes

External links 

1928 births
2001 deaths
Australian rules footballers from Victoria (Australia)
Sydney Swans players